Bank of Taian Co., Ltd. trading as Taian Bank is a Chinese urban commercial bank based in Tai'an, Shandong Province.

The bank was formerly known as Taian City Commercial Bank. It was reported that the bank was linked to Tai'an-born Xiao Jianhua's Tomorrow Group, which "New Fortune" accused that Xiao owned some of the private investors of the bank by proxy person. Those accused companies, did pledged the shares to private equity funds of New Times Securities (another firm that was accused as a member of Tomorrow Group). However, also pledged the shares to state-owned China Fortune Trust (and its private equity funds).

Tai'an Municipal People's Government owned 34.56% shares as the largest (known) shareholder consortium.

History
The predecessor of the bank was founded in 1986. On 16 August 2007 it became Taian City Commercial Bank and on 12 November 2015 became Taian Bank.

Shareholders
Tai'an Finance Bureau-owned Taian Taishan Investment and its subsidiaries owned 30.01% shares of the bank as at 31 December 2012, while another city-owned company owned an additional 6.25% shares. Puhua Investment, a company majority owned by a central-government enterprise and Taian Fund Investment & Guaranty (a subsidiary of Taian Taishan Investment) at that time, owned 7.29% shares, making the state owned 43.55% shares in total.

In 2013, Taian Fund Investment & Guaranty sold the shares (22.51%) to sister companies, as well as selling the stake in Puhua Investment to private investor in 2015, making Taian Government owned 34.56% shares in total in the bank (as at 31 December 2015). The stake was also diluted by the  capital increase ( share capital with  nominal value and  share premium) in 2013–14, as only Taian Taishan Investment and its subsidiaries, a new investor Shandong Xinchazhuang Mining for 37.49 million shares, some existing private shareholders (Tài'ānshì Tàishān Huáchéng Kējì, Tài'ān Rénréndá Kējì and Jǐnán Sānwàng Sùliào for 167.69 million shares) and employee subscribed the shares (4.79 million shares).

Note:
another joint-largest shareholder, Jǐnán Sānwàng Sùliào had pledged 17.7 million shares to New Times Securities since December 2015 it was report that 24.6 million shares were pledged to a private equity fund of New Times Securities from October 2014 to October 2015
the 5th largest shareholder, was the second largest shareholder of Puhua Investment (9th shareholder of the bank) for 38.16% stake; the 99.67% shares of Tàishān Huáchéng Kējì had pledged to China Fortune Trust since May 2015 (a private equity fund of the trust company since 2016).
the 6th largest shareholder Tài'ān Rénréndá Kējì, had pledged most of the shares (105.84 million) to China Fortune Trust since March 2015
the 7th largest shareholder (former name ) had pledged 40.9 million shares to New Times Securities since January 2017 (in 4 tranches) It was reported most of the shares had pledged to 4 private equity funds of New Times Securities in October 2015 for 1-year.
the 9th largest shareholder, Puhua Investment's largest shareholder was central-government owned Potevio (39.04%); 57.82 million shares of the bank were pledged to China Fortune Trust since March 2015
The 10th largest shareholder,  was owned by Tai'an Government (via Tai'an Municipal State-owned Assets Supervision and Administration Commission)
other shareholders such as Shandong Xinchazhuang Mining had pledged all its shares (37.49 million) to Bohai International Trust since March 2016

References

External links
  

Banks of China
Companies based in Shandong
Privately held companies of China
Government-owned companies of China
Companies owned by the provincial government of China